Ninghai or Ning Hai is a county in Ningbo Prefecture, Zhejiang Province, China.

It is also the atonal pinyin romanization of various Chinese names and words, particularly Nínghǎi   meaning "peaceful", "pacified", or "pacifying the sea(s)".

It may refer to:

 Ninghai, a medieval village on the shores of Houhai Lake now known as Qiaodou Village in Licheng District in Putian, Fujian, China
 Ninghai Bridge, an ancient stone bridge over a branch of the Mulan in Qiaodou
 Ninghai New Bridge across the Mulan in Putian
 Chinese cruiser Ning Hai, a light cruiser in the Chinese fleet
 Ning Hai-class cruisers, including the Ning Hai and its sister ship
 Muping District, which was formerly known as "Ninghai"